Fiq District is a district of the Quneitra Governorate in southern Syria, which the governorate has partly been under Israeli occupation since 1967.

Administrative centre is the depopulated town of Fiq, which has been under Israeli occupation since 1967. At the 2004 census the district had a population of 1,947.

Sub-districts
The district of Fiq is divided into two sub-districts or nawāḥī (population as of 2004):

References

 

 
Districts of Quneitra Governorate